Agromyza aristata, the elm agromyzid leafminer, is a species of leaf miner fly in the family Agromyzidae. It is widespread throughout eastern North America, creating leaf mines in Ulmus americana.

References

Agromyzidae
Articles created by Qbugbot
Insects described in 1915
Diptera of North America